O Brother, Where Art Thou? is a 2000 comedy drama film written, produced, co-edited, and directed by Joel and Ethan Coen. It stars George Clooney, John Turturro, and Tim Blake Nelson, with Chris Thomas King, John Goodman, Holly Hunter, and Charles Durning in supporting roles.

The film is set in rural Mississippi during the 1930s, and it follows three escaped convicts searching for hidden treasure while a sheriff relentlessly pursues them. Its story is a modern satire which, while incorporating social features of the American South, is loosely based on Homer's epic Greek poem the Odyssey. Some examples of this include Sirens, a Cyclops, and the main character's name, "Ulysses", which is the Roman name for "Odysseus". The title of the film is a reference to the Preston Sturges 1941 film Sullivan's Travels, in which the protagonist is a director who wants to film O Brother, Where Art Thou?, a fictitious book about the Great Depression.

Much of the music used in the film is period folk music. The movie was one of the first to extensively use digital color correction to give the film an autumnal sepia-tinted look. It was released by Buena Vista Pictures in North America, while Universal Pictures released it in other countries. The film was met with a positive critical reception, and the soundtrack won a Grammy Award for Album of the Year in 2002. The country and folk musicians who were dubbed into the film include John Hartford, Alison Krauss, Dan Tyminski, Emmylou Harris, Gillian Welch, Ralph Stanley, Chris Sharp,  and Patty Loveless. They joined to perform the music from the film in the Down from the Mountain concert tour, which was filmed for consumer consumption via TV and DVD.

Plot
Three convicts, Ulysses Everett McGill, Delmar O'Donnell and Pete escape from a chain gang and set out to retrieve a treasure buried by Everett before the area is flooded to make a lake. The three fail to get on a train before getting a lift from a blind man driving a handcar. He tells them they will find a fortune, but not the one they seek. The trio make their way to Pete's cousin Wash's house. Where they get the chains off and then go to sleep in the barn. But Wash reports them to authorities for a bounty, the sheriff along with his men come and then torch the barn. Wash's son helps them escape in a car.

They pick up Tommy Johnson, a young black man who claims he sold his soul to the devil in exchange for the ability to play guitar (a legend told about blues musician Robert Johnson). In need of money, the four stop at a radio broadcast station where they record a song as the Soggy Bottom Boys. That night the trio and Tommy are found by the police after their car is discovered. Unbeknownst to them, the recording becomes a major hit.

While walking along the road they run into George Nelson fleeing from Police in his car and is looking for directions to Itta Bena. Nelson is trying to go for a record of robbing 3 banks in 2 hours. The trio help him rob the next bank, where an old lady comments that some people call Nelson "Baby Face". Enraged he shouts that he is George Nelson not Baby Face. That night around a campfire Nelson becomes depressed leaves his share of the money with the trio and wanders off alone.

Driving the trio passes a river where Pete hears singing and the group encounters three women washing clothes and singing in the river. The women put them in a trance and they lose consciousness. Upon waking Delmar finds Pete's clothes lying next to him empty except for a toad inside. Delmar is convinced the women were sirens who transformed Pete into the toad. He puts the toad in a shoe box and they get lunch at a restaurant. There a one-eyed man posing as Bible salesman called Big Dan overhears them talking and invites them for a picnic. He then mugs them and kills the toad.

On their way to Everett's home town, Everett and Delmar see Pete working in a chain gang. Upon arriving Everett confronts his wife Penny in a Woolworth. She has changed her last name and told his daughters he was hit by a train, he then gets into a fight with her suitor Vernon. Later that night Everett and Delmar sneak into Pete's holding cell and free him. As it turns out, the women had dragged Pete away and turned him in to the authorities for the bounty. Under torture Pete gave away the treasure's location to the police. Everett then confesses that there is no treasure; he fabricated the story to convince Delmar and Pete to escape with him in order to stop his wife from getting married. Pete, who only had two weeks left on his original sentence and got fifty more years for escaping is enraged. Starting to fight the trio then stumble upon a rally of the Ku Klux Klan, who are planning to hang Tommy. The trio disguise themselves as Klansmen and move to rescue Tommy. However Big Dan, a Klan member reveals their identities. Chaos ensues and the Grand Wizard reveals himself as Homer Stokes, a candidate in the upcoming gubernatorial election. The trio rush Tommy away and cut the supports of a large burning cross incinerating Big Dan.

Everett convinces Pete and Delmar along with Tommy to help him win his wife back. Disguised as musicians they sneak into a Stokes campaign gala dinner she is attending. The group begins a performance of their hit radio songs and the crowd recognizes the song and goes wild. Homer recognizes them as the group who humiliated his mob. When he demands the group be arrested and reveals his white supremacist views, the crowd runs him out of town on a rail. Pappy O'Daniel the incumbent candidate seizes the opportunity and endorses the Soggy Bottom Boys and grants them full pardons. Penny agrees to remarry Everett with the condition that he find her original wedding ring. As they are about to leave to get the ring they see George Nelson being taken by an angry mob to the electric chair.

The next morning the group sets out to retrieve the ring, which is at a cabin in the valley which Everett had earlier claimed was the location of his treasure. The police, having earlier learned of the place from Pete, are waiting for them there and arrest the group. Dismissing their claims of having received pardons, Sheriff Cooley orders them hanged. As Everett prays to God the valley is flooded and they are saved. They find the ring in a writing desk that Tommy is floating on and they return to town. However, when Everett presents the ring to Penny, she states it is her aunt's ring and not her ring. She declares that she will not remarry Ulysses without their original wedding ring. The film ends with Everett arguing with his wife over how hard it will be to find the ring in the now flooded big lake while the blind man from the beginning of the film is viewed by their youngest daughter driving his handcar away.

Cast
 George Clooney as Ulysses Everett McGill. He corresponds to Odysseus (Ulysses) in the Odyssey. His singing voice is dubbed by Dan Tyminski.
 John Turturro as Pete. (He is never called by a last name in the film. However, when Pete is lamenting his betrayal of his friends, he invokes his cousin's earlier betrayal, saying "it must be my Hogwallop blood.") Along with Delmar, Pete represents Odysseus' soldiers who wander with him from Troy to Ithaca, seeking to return home. His singing is dubbed by Harley Allen.
 Tim Blake Nelson as Delmar O'Donnell. Nelson does his own singing on “In the Jailhouse Now”, but otherwise his singing is dubbed by Pat Enright.
 Chris Thomas King as Tommy Johnson, a skilled blues musician. He shares his name and story with Tommy Johnson, a blues musician who is said to have sold his soul to the devil at the Crossroads (also attributed to Robert Johnson).
 John Goodman as Daniel "Big Dan" Teague, a one-eyed mugger and Ku Klux Klan member who masquerades as a Bible salesman. He corresponds to the cyclops Polyphemus in the Odyssey.
 Holly Hunter as Penny Wharvey-McGill, Everett's ex-wife. She corresponds to Penelope in the Odyssey.
 Charles Durning as Menelaus "Pappy" O'Daniel, the governor of Mississippi. The character is based on Texas governor W. Lee "Pappy" O'Daniel. He shares a name with Menelaus, an Odyssey character, but corresponds with Zeus from the narrative.
 Daniel von Bargen as Sheriff Cooley, a ruthless rural sheriff who pursues the trio for the duration of the film. He corresponds to both Poseidon in the Odyssey and also possibly the devil. He has been compared to Boss Godfrey in Cool Hand Luke.
 Wayne Duvall as Homer Stokes, a candidate for governor and the leader of a Ku Klux Klan mob. His singing is dubbed by Ralph Stanley.
 Ray McKinnon as Vernon T. Waldrip. He corresponds to the Suitors of Penelope in the Odyssey.
 Frank Collison as Washington Bartholomew "Wash" Hogwallop, Pete's cousin.
 Michael Badalucco as Baby Face Nelson.
 Stephen Root as Mr. Lund, a blind radio station manager. He corresponds to Homer.
 Lee Weaver as the Blind Seer, who accurately predicts the outcome of the trio's adventure. He corresponds to Tiresias in the Odyssey.
 Mia Tate, Musetta Vander, and Christy Taylor as the three "sirens". Their singing voices are dubbed by Emmylou Harris, Alison Krauss, and Gillian Welch.

Gillian Welch and Dan Tyminski also appear as a record store customer and a mandolinist respectively. Del Pentacost, JR Horne, and Brian Reddy appear as members of Pappy O’Daniel’s staff. Ed Gale appears as Homer Stokes’ ceremonial “little man.” Three members of the Fairfield Four (Isaac Freeman, Wilson Waters Jr, and Robert Hamlett) cameo as gravediggers. The Cox Family and The Whites appear as fictionalized versions of themselves.

Production
The idea of O Brother, Where Art Thou? arose spontaneously. Work on the script began in December 1997, long before the start of production, and was at least half-written by May 1998. Despite the fact that Ethan Coen described the Odyssey as "one of my favorite storyline schemes", neither of the brothers had read the epic, and they were only familiar with its content through adaptations and numerous references to the Odyssey in popular culture. According to the brothers, Tim Blake Nelson (who has a degree in classics from Brown University) was the only person on the set who had read the Odyssey.

The title of the film is a reference to the 1941 Preston Sturges film Sullivan's Travels, in which the protagonist (a director) wants to direct a film about the Great Depression called O Brother, Where Art Thou? that will be a "commentary on modern conditions, stark realism, and the problems that confront the average man". Lacking any experience in this area, the director sets out on a journey to experience the human suffering of the average man but is sabotaged by his anxious studio. The film has some similarity in tone to Sturges's film, including scenes with prison gangs and a black church choir. The prisoners at the picture show scene is also a direct homage to a nearly identical scene in Sturges's film.

Joel Coen revealed in a 2000 interview that he traveled to Phoenix to offer the lead role to Clooney. Clooney agreed to do the role immediately, without reading the script. He stated that he liked even the Coens' least successful films. Clooney did not immediately understand his character and sent the script to his uncle Jack, who lived in Kentucky, asking him to read the entire script into a tape recorder. Unknown to Clooney, in his recording, Jack, a devout Baptist, omitted all instances of the words "damn" and "hell" from the Coens' script, which only became known to Clooney after the directors pointed this out to him during shooting.

This was the fourth film of the brothers in which John Turturro has starred. Other actors in O Brother, Where Art Thou? who had worked previously with the Coens include John Goodman (three films), Holly Hunter (two), Charles Durning (two) and Michael Badalucco (one).

The Coens used digital color correction to give the film a sepia-tinted look. Joel stated this was because the actual set was "greener than Ireland". Cinematographer Roger Deakins said, "Ethan and Joel favored a dry, dusty Delta look with golden sunsets. They wanted it to look like an old hand-tinted picture, with the intensity of colors dictated by the scene and natural skin tones that were all shades of the rainbow." Initially the crew tried to perform the color correction using a physical process, but after several tries with various chemical processes proved unsatisfactory the process was performed digitally.

This was the fifth film collaboration between the Coen Brothers and Deakins, and it was slated to be shot in Mississippi at a time of year when the foliage, grass, trees, and bushes would be a lush green. It was filmed near locations in Canton, Mississippi, and Florence, South Carolina in the summer of 1999. After shooting tests, including film bipack and bleach bypass techniques, Deakins suggested digital mastering be used. Deakins spent 11 weeks fine-tuning the look, mainly targeting the greens, making them a burnt yellow and desaturating the overall image in the digital files. This made it the first feature film to be entirely color corrected by digital means, narrowly beating Nick Park's Chicken Run. O Brother, Where Art Thou? was the first time a digital intermediate was used on the entirety of a first-run Hollywood film that otherwise had very few visual effects. The work was done in Los Angeles by Cinesite using a Spirit DataCine for scanning at 2K resolution, a Pandora MegaDef to adjust the color, and a Kodak Lightning II recorder to put out to film.

A major theme of the film is the connection between old-time music and political campaigning in the  American South. It makes reference to the traditions, institutions, and campaign practices of bossism and political reform that defined Southern politics in the first half of the 20th century.

The Ku Klux Klan, at the time a political force of white populism, is depicted burning crosses and engaging in ceremonial dance. The character Menelaus "Pappy" O'Daniel, the governor of Mississippi and host of the radio show The Flour Hour, is similar in name and demeanor to W. Lee "Pappy" O'Daniel, one-time Governor of Texas and later U.S. Senator from that state. O'Daniel was in the flour business and used a backing band called the Light Crust Doughboys on his radio show. In one campaign, O'Daniel carried a broom, an oft-used campaign device in the reform era, promising to sweep away patronage and corruption. His theme song had the hook, "Please pass the biscuits, Pappy", emphasizing his connection with flour.

While the film borrows from historical politics, there are clear differences between the characters in the film and historical political figures. The O'Daniel of the movie used "You Are My Sunshine" as his theme song (which was originally recorded by singer and Governor of Louisiana James Houston "Jimmie" Davis), and Homer Stokes, as the challenger to the incumbent O'Daniel, portrays himself as the "reform candidate", using a broom as a prop.

Music

The music was originally conceived as a major component of the film, not merely as a background or a support. Producer and musician T Bone Burnett worked with the Coens while the script was still in its working phases and the soundtrack was recorded before filming commenced.

Much of the music used in the film is period-specific folk music. The musical selection also includes religious music including Primitive Baptist and traditional African American gospel, most notably the Fairfield Four, an a cappella quartet with a career extending back to 1921. The quartet appears in the soundtrack and as gravediggers towards the film's end. Selected songs in the film reflect the possible spectrum of musical styles typical of the old culture of the American South: gospel, delta blues, country, swing, and bluegrass.

The use of dirges and other macabre songs is a theme that often recurs in Appalachian music ("O Death", "Lonesome Valley", "Angel Band", "I Am Weary") in contrast to bright and cheerful songs ("Keep On the Sunny Side", "In the Highways") in other parts of the film.

The voices of the Soggy Bottom Boys were provided by Dan Tyminski (lead vocal on "Man of Constant Sorrow"), Nashville songwriter Harley Allen, and the Nashville Bluegrass Band's Pat Enright. The three won a CMA Award for Single of the Year and a Grammy Award for Best Country Collaboration with Vocals, both for the song "Man of Constant Sorrow". Tim Blake Nelson sang the lead vocal on "In the Jailhouse Now". Clooney recalled at a Nashville Film Festival cast reunion in 2020 going in a studio and singing, since it was assumed as the nephew of Rosemary Clooney, he could. But he could not.

"Man of Constant Sorrow" has five variations: two are used in the film, one in the music video, and two in the soundtrack album. Two of the variations feature the verses being sung back-to-back, and the other three variations feature additional music between each verse. Though the song received little significant radio airplay, it reached #35 on the U.S. Billboard Hot Country Singles & Tracks chart in 2002. The version of "I'll Fly Away" heard in the film is performed not by Krauss and Welch (as it is on the CD and concert tour), but by the Kossoy Sisters with Erik Darling accompanying on long-neck five-string banjo, recorded in 1956 for the album Bowling Green on Tradition Records.

Release
The film premiered at the AFI Film Festival on October 19, 2000, and the United States on December 22, 2000. It grossed $71,868,327 worldwide on a $26 million budget.

Critical reception
The review aggregation website Rotten Tomatoes gives it a score of 78% based on 154 reviews and an average score of 7.12/10. The consensus reads: "Though not as good as Coen brothers' classics such as Blood Simple, the delightfully loopy O Brother, Where Art Thou? is still a lot of fun." The film holds an average score of 69/100 on Metacritic based on 30 reviews.

Roger Ebert gave two and a half out of four stars to the film, saying all the scenes in the film were "wonderful in their different ways, and yet I left the movie uncertain and unsatisfied".

Accolades
The film was selected to be part of the main competition of the 2000 Cannes Film Festival.

Soggy Bottom Boys
The Soggy Bottom Boys are the fictional musical group that the main characters form to serve as accompaniment for the film. It has been suggested that the name is in homage to the Foggy Mountain Boys, a bluegrass band led by Lester Flatt and Earl Scruggs. In the film, the songs credited to the band are lip-synched by the actors, except that Tim Blake Nelson does sing his own vocals on "In the Jailhouse Now".

The band's hit single is Dick Burnett's "Man of Constant Sorrow", a song that had enjoyed much success prior to the movie's release. After the film's release, the fictitious band became so popular that the country and folk musicians who were dubbed into the film got together and performed the music from the film in a Down from the Mountain concert tour, which was filmed for TV and DVD. They included Ralph Stanley, John Hartford, Alison Krauss, Emmylou Harris, Gillian Welch, Chris Sharp, Stun Seymour, Dan Tyminski and others.

Notes

References

External links

 
 
 
 
 
  American Studies at the University of Virginia

2000 comedy films
2000 films
2000s American films
2000s British films
2000s English-language films
2000s French films
2000s buddy comedy-drama films
American comedy-drama films
American buddy comedy-drama films
Americana
British comedy-drama films
Country music films
Cultural depictions of Baby Face Nelson
English-language French films
Films about disability
Films about the Ku Klux Klan
Films based on the Odyssey
Films directed by the Coen brothers
Films set in 1937
Films set in Mississippi
Films shot in Mississippi
Films scored by T Bone Burnett
French comedy-drama films
Great Depression films
Modern adaptations of the Odyssey
StudioCanal films
Touchstone Pictures films
Treasure hunt films
Universal Pictures films
Working Title Films films
Films featuring a Best Musical or Comedy Actor Golden Globe winning performance